Hogg Island, (sometimes referred to as Hog Island)  is the largest of the hundreds of islands in the Essequibo River in Guyana, it is located just 5 km from the river's mouth in its estuary into the Atlantic Ocean.

With a total area of  this island is larger than many Caribbean islands.  Its 250 residents are engaged mainly in the farming of rice and ground provisions. The population has decreased a lot because of migration to other parts of Guyana, However, there is still a primary school and a church on Hogg Island.

History
The island used to be controlled by the Dutch when it was known as Varken Eiland  or Hog Island, so named due to it being inhabited by a large number of wild hogs. Then in 1814 with the cessation of the Napoleonic Wars the British gained control of the Dutch colonies: Demerara, Berbice, and Essequibo, leaving the Dutch with Suriname until 1975. The British had decided to keep the name of the island as the Dutch did "Hogg Island".

Windmill
A windmill is located on the former plantation Lyksburg. The windmill is the only remaining mill in Guyana, and was constructed in 1768. The National Trust of Guyana restored the mill in 2010, and it has been declared a national monument.

References

River islands of Guyana
Essequibo Islands-West Demerara